A career is an individual's journey through learning, work and other aspects of life.

Career or Careers may also refer to:
 Career (1938 film), a 1938 Swedish drama film
 Career (1939 film), a 1939 American drama film
 Career (1959 film), a 1959 American drama film
 Career (play), a 1956 play by James Lee, later made into the 1959 film
 Careers (film), a 1929 drama film 
 Careers (album), a 2014 album by the American duo Beverly
 Careers (board game), a board game first manufactured by Parker Brothers in 1955

See also
Career criminal
Career soldier